Hero is a 1997 Hong Kong martial arts film written and directed by Corey Yuen. The film stars Taiwanese-Japanese actor Takeshi Kaneshiro, established Hong Kong action stars from the China Drama Academy (Yuen Biao, Yuen Wah, Corey Yuen, Yuen Tak) and Hong Kong actresses Valerie Chow and Jessica Hsuan. Hero is a remake of the 1972 film Boxer from Shantung. The film was produced by then TVB chairwoman Mona Fong.

Plot 
At the end of the Qing Dynasty due to poverty and starvation, Ma Wing-jing (Takeshi Kaneshiro) and his older brother Ma Tai-cheung (Yuen Wah) flee from their harsh homeland to the big city of Shanghai to make their fortune. Once they arrive in Shanghai reality sets in and both are only able to secure jobs as coolies (bitter hard manual labor) making chump change. Wing-jing admires the local triad gangster boss Tam Sei's (Yuen Biao) life style. Tam, seeing Ma Wing-jing admire his horse carriage, challenges Wing-jing to a human versus horse race. Wing-jing accepts his challenge, after seeing Wing-jing's determination, loyalty, fighting skills and athleticism, the two strike up a friendship and Tam tells Wing-jing to visit his night club one day if he ever needs help.

The two most powerful mob bosses in Shanghai are Tam Sei, who has the British government backing him, and Yang Shuang (Yuen Tak), who has the entire Shanghai police force working for him. Both are at odds to gain full control of Shanghai's crime organization. Ma Wing-jing gains more trust from Tam Sei when he hears about and intervene's in Yang Shaung's assassination attempt on Tam Sei, saving Tam's life. As a reward, Tam gives Wing-jing a small territory in Shanghai to control. Wing-jing uses it to his advantage to gain more territory in Shanghai. All is well and prosperous until he tries to conquer the territory belonging to Yang Shuang. Blinded by his power and greed, he is betrayed by the one he had trusted the most, leading to tragedy for himself and Tam, who, despite Wing-jing's foolishness, still remains his friend.

Cast 
Takeshi Kaneshiro as Ma Wing-jing
Yuen Biao as Tam Sei
Jessica Hsuan as Kam Ling-tze
Valerie Chow as Yam Yeung-tien
Yuen Wah as Ma Tai-cheung
Yuen Tak as Yang Shuang
Corey Yuen Kwai as Uncle Po

Production crew 
Production Manager: Jackson Ha 
Sound Recording: True Technic Limited
Art Director: Lau Man-hung
Lighting: Chan Wai-lin
Planning: Chang Oi-bing, Wan Pak-nam, Lawrence Wong 
Makeup: Lee Wai-fong
Hair Stylist: Sharon Li
Costume Designer: Dora Ng
Props: Lai Yu, Hung Hin-fat
Assistant Director: Bill Chan, Chan Sek
Action Director: Yuen Tak, Corey Yuen
Assistant Action Director: Jonathan Ting, Jacky Tang

References

External links 
 
 
 
 http://www.lovehkfilm.com/reviews/hero_1997.htm
 http://hkmdb.com/db/movies/view.mhtml?id=8273&display_set=eng
 http://www.hkcinema.co.uk/Reviews/hero1997.html

1997 films
1990s action films
Remakes of Hong Kong films
Hong Kong action thriller films
Hong Kong martial arts films
1990s Cantonese-language films
Shaw Brothers Studio films
Films set in Shanghai
Films shot in Shanghai
Triad films
Films directed by Corey Yuen
1990s Hong Kong films